Valcin is a surname. Notable people with the surname include:

 Cléante Valcin (1891–1956), Haitian activist and writer
 David Valcin, American actor
 Gerard Valcin (1923–1988), Haitian painter

Surnames of Haitian origin